The Cornell Big Red baseball team is a varsity intercollegiate athletic team of Cornell University in Ithaca, New York, United States. The team is a member of the Ivy League, which is part of NCAA Division I. Cornell's first baseball team was fielded in 1869 and participated in the Eastern Intercollegiate Baseball League (EIBL) until 1992. The team plays its home games at Hoy Field in Ithaca, New York.

History

Davy Hoy
David "Davy" F. Hoy, an alumnus and longtime university registrar, served as the university's baseball advisor for thirty years at the start of the 20th century. He traveled south with the team for spring training each year. Hoy baseball field was built at his urging in 1922, and named for him in 1923. Hoy threw out the first pitch on the field; the ball he used is preserved in the Kroch Library collections. Hoy was injured in a 1929 bus accident in Virginia while riding with the baseball team, and he died in December 1930 at age 67. Cornell's fight song, Give My Regards to Davy references "Davy" Hoy prominently.

Major League Baseball
Cornell has had 14 Major League Baseball Draft selections since the draft began in 1965.

See also
List of NCAA Division I baseball programs

References

External links
 

 
Baseball teams established in 1869
1869 establishments in New York (state)